Warnman, also spelt Wanman, is a possibly extinct Australian Aboriginal language, of the Wati branch of the Pama–Nyungan family. It was spoken near Jigalong in Western Australia by the Warnman people (Warman), who are a subgroup of Martu people (Mardu).

Antakarinya might be closer to Wanman than it is to the Western Desert Language (reference?).

Sounds
Consonant inventory

Vowel inventory

References

Wati languages
Indigenous Australian languages in Western Australia